Mark Howard Horton (born 22 February 1950) is a British bridge journalist and expert player, as well as a former archaeologist  and chess champion. He was the editor of Bridge Magazine from 1995 until it ceased publication at the end of 2017, and then became the editor of its purely online successors, first A New Bridge Magazine and subsequently BeBRIDGE. He currently lives in Bath with his partner Liz.

Chess accomplishments
Horton was a powerful chess player who as a Junior represented England and subsequently played for Great Britain in the European Team Correspondence Championship, winning the gold medal on his board as the team took the bronze. He penned a series of articles and booklets on Opening theory and American legend Bobby Fischer used one of his suggestions to win a game against Russian Mark Taimanov on his way to the World title. His one full-length book on chess, published in 1977, is French Defence 1.

Bridge career
Horton developed an interest in bridge in the early seventies. Chess has taken a back seat ever since, and in 1993 he ended his law career to pursue bridge-related interests full-time. He was fortunate to live in Nottingham, which was the home of International Popular Bridge Monthly and thus provided opportunity to listen, learn and play with the pick of England's players including Tony Sowter, Tony Forrester, Graham Kirby, Brian Senior and Sally Brock.

On the advice of Forrester, Horton formed a partnership with Richard Winter and they rapidly rose to the top, winning in rapid succession a host of major events in Britain including the Life Master Pairs, the Grandmaster Pairs, Crockford's Cup and the Spring Foursomes. Their success earned them invitations to overseas events and they won both the famous Hoechst Team tournament and the Dunhill Cup. They represented England on numerous occasions and were on the "Great Britain" team in Albuquerque for the 1994 world teams championship (Rosenblum Cup, not a national teams tournament).

It was in that same year that Mark was asked by Patrick Jourdain to work at the European Mixed Championships in Barcelona – the only snag was that it meant that he would not be allowed to play. He decided to accept and when Jourdain announced at the end of the event that he wanted to retire from working on the Bridge Bulletin, the European Bridge League (EBL) appointed Horton its Chief Editor, a post he has held ever since.

In 1995 he was invited to become Editor of Bridge Magazine, the world's oldest bridge publication (since in May 1926) and he has been doing that ever since. He started writing bridge books, and is now well into double figures. His latest, Misplay these Hands with Me, has earned rave reviews and was short listed for the 2008 Master Point Press Book of the Year award, which his book I Love This Game, with Sabine Auken, won in 2006.

Although his partnership with Winter came to an end, Mark continued to play in international events. He has won events in numerous countries, including  Australia, France, Germany, the Netherlands, Romania, the United States, Portugal, Egypt and Malta.

It was in Malta that he met Rabbi Leonard Helman, and they formed a professional partnership until Rabbi Helman died in 2013. They were in the prize money in Malta, and ever since they have played in two or three events a year, at the ACBL Nationals and in some overseas events. A couple of years ago they won the Polish Team Championships in Sopot along with their regular Bulgarian teammates Vladi Isporski, Valentin Kovachev and Victor Aronov.

He has been an editor for numerous Daily Bulletins at tournaments, including the World Team Championships in Shanghai in 2007. "No international tournament is complete without his presence as bulletin editor."

Publications
French Defence 1 (about chess), The Chess Player, 1977
Petroff Defence : A Line for White (about chess), The Chess Player, 1980, 
For Love Or Money, with Brian Senior, Master Point Press, 2000
 
The Bridge Magicians, Master Point Press
The Hands of Time, Master Point Press, 2004
25 Conventions for Acol Players, Master Point Press 2005
I Love this Game, with Sabine Auken 2006
Bridge Master vs. Bridge Amateur, Master Point Press, 2007
Misplay these Hands with Me, Master Point Press, 2007
Duplicate Bridge at Home, Master Point Press, 2008
The Pocket Guide to Acol Bridge, Master Point Press, forthcoming in 2009
 
 
  A revision of Step-by-step Signalling published by Batsford, 1994

References

External links
 
 
  [no service 2014-05-18; see WorldCat and LCCN, below]

1950 births
British and Irish contract bridge players
Contract bridge writers
Living people
Place of birth missing (living people)